Since 2009, the Conservative Party in the United Kingdom has experimented with the use of open primaries to select some parliamentary candidates.

The first primaries were held ahead of the 2010 general election. More than a dozen primaries were held ahead of the 2015 general election.

Selection committee
The members of the selection committee are as follows:

2010 general election
Primaries were held in a few seats, including Oxford West and Abingdon, Totnes, Gosport and Bracknell.

Totnes

Totnes was the first constituency to use an open primary to select the Conservative prospective parliamentary candidate. The election was held in August 2009 and saw a turnout of approximately 25%. Due to the success of this primary election, David Cameron announced that the system would be applied to other constituencies in future. Dr Sarah Wollaston, a general practitioner, was selected with 48% of the vote. Wollaston went on to be elected MP for Totnes at the 2010 general election.

Bracknell 
The Bracknell primary was held in October 2009, and was won by Phillip Lee. Other candidates included Rory Stewart (elected as MP for Penrith and the Border in 2010) and broadcaster Iain Dale.

Gosport

Gosport held an open primary to select a candidate to succeed Peter Viggers upon his retirement from Westminster. The election was held in December 2009. Caroline Dinenage, a local business owner and daughter of Fred Dinenage, was selected with 38% of the vote. Dinenage was elected MP for Gosport at the 2010 general election, with an increased majority.

Clacton by-election, 2014

The 2014 Clacton by-election, caused by the defection from the Conservatives of Douglas Carswell, a prominent advocate of open primaries, selected actor Giles Watling over Colchester councillor Sue Lissimore on 11 September.

Rochester and Strood by-election, 2014

The candidate for the 2014 Rochester and Strood by-election, caused by the defection from the Conservative Party of Mark Reckless to the UK Independence Party (UKIP), was chosen by a postal open primary. Kelly Tolhurst, a local councillor, narrowly won over fellow councillor Anna Firth. Tolhurst lost the by-election to Reckless, but later won the seat at the following year's general election. Firth would go on to become an MP succeeding Sir David Amess after his murder.

2015 general election

2019 general election

References